Skenea coronadoensis, common name the Coronado Island skenea, is a species of sea snail, a marine gastropod mollusk in the family Skeneidae.

References

 Turgeon, D.D., J.F. Quinn Jr., A.E. Bogan, E.V. Coan, F.G. Hochberg, W.G. Lyons, P.M. Mikkelsen, R.J. Neves, C.F.E. Roper, G. Rosenberg, B. Roth, A. Scheltema, F.G. Thompson, M. Vecchione and J.D. Willams 1998 Common and scientific names of aquatic invertebrates from the United States and Canada: Mollusks, 2nd ed. American Fisheries Society (Special publication 26), Bethesda, Maryland. 526 p.

External links
 To World Register of Marine Species

coronadoensis
Gastropods described in 1903